Francisco Gomez (born January 25, 1979 in Watsonville, California) is an American former soccer player.

Club career
Gomez joined the Kansas City Wizards in 1999, after playing briefly with the California Jaguars of the A-League.  He saw little playing time in his first two years, however - as a rookie, he appeared in seven games, scoring one goal, while in his second year he appeared in 14 (seven starts), scoring two goals and one assist.  Gomez played a key role in Kansas City's road to MLS Cup 2000 scoring the game winner in quarterfinal game against the Colorado Rapids. Gomez began to see significantly increased playing time in 2001, when he appeared in 24 games, 18 of them starts, while scoring four goals and six assists.  Gomez kept something of a utility role during his later MLS career.  In his six years with Kansas City, Gomez appeared in 114 games, registering 14 goals and 14 assists.  After the 2004 season, he was selected seventh overall in the MLS Expansion Draft by Chivas USA.

Gomez was released by Chivas in the middle of the 2006 season, and joined Miami FC in the USL First Division for the remainder of the season where he made seven appearances and scored 1 goal.

In January 2007, Gomez was hired as the new player-coach of Bakersfield Brigade.

National team
Although Gomez played a significant role for several of the United States youth national teams, he never earned a cap with the senior team.  He captained the US in the 1995 FIFA U-17 World Championship, and was a significant part of the U-20 national team, playing alongside Tim Howard, Carlos Bocanegra, Steve Cherendolo in the 1999 FIFA World Youth Championship in Nigeria.

References

1979 births
Living people
American soccer coaches
American soccer players
Bakersfield Brigade players
California Jaguars players
Chivas USA players
Miami FC (2006) players
Sporting Kansas City players
American sportspeople of Mexican descent
A-League (1995–2004) players
USL League Two players
People from Watsonville, California
Major League Soccer players
USL First Division players
United States men's youth international soccer players
United States men's under-20 international soccer players
MLS Pro-40 players
Soccer players from California
Association football midfielders